The mausoleum of Sheikh Dursun is a historic tomb located in north-east of Agsu in Azerbaijan.

History
The date of construction of the monument is shown as 1457 in the materials of Agsu Museum of History and Local Lore and in many articles of "Birlik" newspaper published in Agsu district.
There is an inscription on the tomb which consists of two lines. As a result of partial disruption of the inscription on the monument, there are various views on the history of the tomb. According to these writings, Ahmed Padar's son Sheikh Dursun, who died in 1399 is buried inside of the mausoleum.

Professor Mashadikhanum Nemat read the writings of the inscription as:

Architectural features
The mausoleum is built of whitestones.  It is in the form of eight-sided pyramid. The width of each side is 1,6 meters and its height is 3 meters. The top of the monument is also in the shape of eight-sided prism in accordance with the body of the building. The entrance of the tomb consist of three whole hewn stones: two side portals and the upper part of the entrance is built of whitestones. The top part of the monument is covered with cone-shaped arch.

See also
Padar tribe

References

Mausoleums in Azerbaijan
Buildings and structures completed in the 15th century
Tourist attractions in Azerbaijan 
Architecture in Azerbaijan